This list of castles in Hungary article consists mostly of the well-known castles on the territory of today's Hungary.

List of castles

See also
Palaces and mansions in Hungary

External links
Homepage of castles in Hungary and in the ancient Hungarian Kingdom

 
Castles
Hungary
Hungary
Casltes